Rathmore railway station is a station on the Mallow to Tralee railway line and serves the town of Rathmore in County Kerry, Ireland.

The station opened on 1 December 1854 and was closed for goods traffic on 3 November 1975.

References

External links
Irish Rail Rathmore Station Website 

Iarnród Éireann stations in County Kerry
Railway stations in County Kerry
Railway stations opened in 1854
1854 establishments in Ireland
Railway stations in the Republic of Ireland opened in the 19th century